Yakounia is a genus of evolutely coiled, planispiral ammonite, coiled so all whorls are exposed, with close transverse ribbing.  This genus lived during the Toarcian stage, late early Jurassic, and has been found in western British Columbia. The brief description is based on that of the subfamily.

Yakounia is included in the hildoceratid family, subfamily Grammoceratinae. Related genera include such as Grammoceras, Costigrammoceras, and Phenakocerites

References 

 Yakounia in  Paleobiology Database 9/01/13 
 D.T Donovan, J.H Callomon, and  M.K. Howarth, 1981, Classification of the Jurassic Ammonitina; The Systematics Association Special Volume no.18, The Ammonoidea. 
 G. K. Jakobs. 1997. Toarcian (Early Jurassic) ammonoids from western North America. Geological Survey of Canada, Bulletin 428

Ammonitida genera
Fossils of British Columbia
Toarcian life